David Richard Kaczynski (born October 3, 1949) is the younger brother of Ted Kaczynski, the serial bomber dubbed the "Unabomber" by the FBI before his arrest in 1996. His memoir, Every Last Tie: The Story of the Unabomber and His Family, details his relationship with his brother and parents and the decision that David and his wife made to share their suspicion that Ted was the Unabomber with law enforcement, which led to his arrest. David's ultimate decision to implicate his brother for the bombings resulted in Ted ceasing all communication with his family, including failing to respond to all of David's attempted correspondence since imprisoned.

Biography

Early life 

Kaczynski is a graduate of Columbia University, class of 1970.  Between December 1966 and May 1967, he wrote ten articles for the Columbia Daily Spectator and was promoted to the associate news board in March 1967. Kaczynski worked as a schoolteacher in Lisbon, Iowa, in the mid-1970s.

Role in Unabomber's arrest 
After the anonymous Unabomber demanded in 1995 that his manifesto, Industrial Society and Its Future, be published in a major newspaper as a condition for ceasing his mail-bomb campaign, The New York Times and The Washington Post published the manifesto, hoping somebody would recognize the writing style of the author.

David's wife, Linda Patrik, first suspected Theodore and urged David to read the manifesto when it was published. David recognized Ted's writing style, and the criminal defense lawyer the couple hired notified authorities. On April 3, 1996, police arrested Ted in his rural cabin in Lincoln, Montana. David had received assurances from the FBI that his identity as the informant would be kept secret, but his name was leaked to the media. In addition, he sought a guarantee from federal prosecutors that Ted would receive appropriate psychiatric evaluation and treatment. The Justice Department's subsequent pursuit of the death penalty, and Attorney General Janet Reno's initial refusal to accept a plea bargain in exchange for a life sentence, was seen by David and other members of his family as a betrayal. Such a plea bargain was eventually reached, and Ted was sentenced to life imprisonment without possibility of parole. Kaczynski has since said that the decision to report his brother was painful but he felt morally compelled to do so.

David Kaczynski received a $1 million reward from the FBI for the Unabomber's capture. The reward was funded by a Congressional appropriation for the Justice Department and was, at the time, one of the largest rewards issued in a domestic case. In 1998, Kaczynski told the Associated Press that he planned to distribute the majority of the reward money to the bombing victims and their families, adding that this "might help us resolve our grief over what happened." Kaczynski went on to set up the Unabomb Survivors Fund, which donated $630,000 (after legal fees and taxes) to the victims of his brother's bombings.

Career 
Prior to turning his brother Ted in to authorities, David Kaczynski worked as an assistant director of a shelter for runaway and homeless youth in Albany, New York, where he counseled and advocated for troubled, neglected, and abused youth. His brother's confrontation with the death penalty later motivated David Kaczynski to become an anti-death-penalty activist. In 2001, Kaczynski was named executive director of New Yorkers Against the Death Penalty (as of 2008, New Yorkers for Alternatives to the Death Penalty). While the mission of NYADP originally focused only on ending the death penalty, under Kaczynski's guidance in 2008, it broadened its mission to address the unmet needs of all those affected by violence, including victims and their families. After leaving the NYADP, Kaczynski served as executive director of Karma Triyana Dharmachakra, a Tibetan Buddhist monastery located in Woodstock, New York.

Personal life
Kaczynski is married to Linda Patrik. He is a practicing Buddhist and a vegetarian. In 2009, he published an essay about his relationship with his brother Ted, from childhood to adulthood, which appeared in a collection of essays.

In popular culture
David Kaczynski appeared in Netflix documentary Unabomber: In His Own Words (2020 TV mini-series).  He was portrayed by Robert Hays in the 1996 television movie Unabomber: The True Story and by Mark Duplass in the 2017 television series Manhunt: Unabomber.

References

External links
 New Yorkers for Alternatives to the Death Penalty
 David Kaczynski   – Blog
 
 
 

1949 births
Living people
Columbia College (New York) alumni
People from Evergreen Park, Illinois
Place of birth missing (living people)
American Buddhists
American people of Polish descent
American anti–death penalty activists
People from Capital District (New York)
Schoolteachers from Iowa